Echo Kellum (born August 29, 1982) is an American actor and comedian. Kellum is best known for his roles as Curtis Holt on The CW drama series Arrow, Tommy on the FOX sitcom Ben and Kate, and Hunter on NBC's Sean Saves the World.

Early life 
Born in Chicago, Illinois, he moved to Los Angeles in late 2009 to pursue a career in comedy. He is a graduate of The Groundlings, I.O. West, and the Upright Citizens Brigade.

Career
Kellum gained his first major role in 2012 when he was cast in the FOX comedy Ben and Kate (then titled Ben Fox Is My Manny) playing the role of Tommy, the best friend of the titular character Ben (Nat Faxon). Following Ben and Kate, Kellum was cast as Hunter in NBC's Sean Saves the World starring Sean Hayes and Megan Hilty.

In 2015, Kellum was cast in the recurring role of Curtis Holt, based on the DC Comics character Mister Terrific, in the fourth season of The CW drama series Arrow. Holt is a technological savant and inventor who initially works at Palmer Technologies under the supervision of Felicity Smoak, and later becomes a member of Team Arrow. Kellum also went on to portray the character in the Arrow spin-off series Legends of Tomorrow. In April 2016, it was announced that Kellum would be promoted to series regular for the fifth season of Arrow. Kellum exited the series during its seventh season in 2019. He returned for two episodes in Arrow's final season.

In 2017, Kellum appeared in Netflix's Girlfriend's Day as Madsen, beat poet and a co-worker of Bob Odenkirk's character.

Kellum voices the character "King Joaquín" on the Disney Channel animated series Elena of Avalor. He also voices multiple characters for the Adult Swim animated series Rick and Morty.

In 2021, Kellum landed a role on the NBC series Grand Crew.

Filmography

References

External links
 

Male actors from Chicago
American male comedians
American male television actors
Living people
21st-century American male actors
Comedians from Illinois
21st-century American comedians
1982 births